"Summa" is the eighth single by the Bay Area collective Peach Tree Rascals, released on July 31, 2019 by Homedale Projects and 10K Projects.

Background and composition 
The song was made in one night during one of their first writing trips to LA. Joseph Barrios, one of the members, shared his thought process behind the song: "When I think of summer it reminds of long days and long nights doing stupid shit with my friends. During this time of the year I’m always living care free and all the other things on my mind go on hold. I always had this mindset of living out my youth while it lasts especially in the 'summa.'"
The music video premiered exclusively on Billboard on July 30. The song talks about being young, as well as summer.

The song appeared on the third episode of the third season of the Netflix show On My Block.

References 

 Peach Tree Rascals songs
 2019 singles